E. nepalensis may refer to:

 Ebertius nepalensis, a ground beetle
 Elaphoidella nepalensis, a freshwater copepod
 Elaphrolaelaps nepalensis, a mite with a single pair of spiracles positioned laterally on the body
 Endelus nepalensis, a jewel beetle
 Epicauta nepalensis, a blister beetle
 Episcardia nepalensis, a fungus moth
 Eria nepalensis, a flowering plant
 Erigone nepalensis, a carnivorous spider
 Erioptera nepalensis, a crane fly